Events from the year 1266 in Ireland:

Incumbent
Lord: Henry III

Deaths
Máeleoin Bódur Ó Maolconaire, historian and poet.

References

 
1260s in Ireland
Ireland
Years of the 13th century in Ireland